Eremogone saxatilis is a species of flowering plant belonging to the family Caryophyllaceae.

Its native range is Eastern Europe to Siberia and Central Asia.

Synonym:
 Arenaria saxatilis L.

References

Caryophyllaceae